The Hornitos Formation is a Campanian geologic formation of the Algarrobal Basin in the Atacama Region of northern Chile. The formation comprises limestones, sandstones, conglomerates, marls and tuff. Dinosaur remains are among the fossils that have been recovered from the formation, including the sauropod Arackar licanantay.

Description 
The Hornillos Formation, deposited in the Algarrobal Basin, comprises sandstones, limestones, conglomerates, and caliches, intercalated with lavas and andesitic breccias and various volcanic rocks. The smallest pieces were found as rollings, whereas the larger piece was included in the limestone.

The Hornitos Formation formerly was thought to be of Paleocene to Eocene age. The formation may be older and belong to the Early Cretaceous, as a granite intruded the rocks about 105 ± 10 Ma.

See also 
 List of dinosaur-bearing rock formations
 List of stratigraphic units with indeterminate dinosaur fossils
 Abanico Formation

References

Bibliography

Further reading 
 G. Chong Diaz. 1985. Hallazgo de restos oseos de dinosaurios en la Formación Hornitos – Tercera Region de Atacama – Chile. IV Congreso Geologico Chileno 152-161
 P. Salinas, P. Sepúlveda, and L. G. Marshall. 1991. Hallazgo de restos oseos de dinosaurios (saurópodos) en la Formación Pajonales (Cretácico Superior), Sierra de Almeyda, Región de Antofagasta, Chile: implicancia cronológica [Discovery of skeletal remains of dinosaurs (sauropods) in the Pajonales Formation (Upper Cretaceous), Sierra de Almeyda, Antofagasta Region, Chile: chronological implications]. 6e Congreso Geológico Chileño, Viña del Mar. Resumenes Expandidos. Servicio Nacional de Geología y Mineria, Chile 534-537

Geologic formations of Chile
Upper Cretaceous Series of South America
Cretaceous Chile
Campanian Stage
Sandstone formations
Limestone formations
Marl formations
Conglomerate formations
Tuff formations
Geology of Atacama Region